Suresh V. Shenoy is an Indian-American engineer, senior business executive and philanthropist.

Suresh V. Shenoy is Executive Vice President at Information Management Consultants, Inc., a Virginia-based consulting and technology services company that provides information technology and software development services.  He and his company, known for their philanthropic endeavours, received Northern Virginia Community Foundation's prestigious community leader award for 2009 from US Congressman Gerald E Connolly in the US House of Representatives.

Suresh Shenoy currently serves as Chairman of American Red Cross, National Capital Region (United States).  He is on the boards of The Kevric Company, IMC Global Services, The Fairfax County Information Technology Advisory Committee, the Capital IIT Alumni Association and the Fairfax County Chamber of Commerce.  He was also the Program Committee Chairman of the PanIIT Global Conference held in Washington, DC attended by more than 2,300 people.  He served as co-President of the PanIIT Alumni Association in North America for the 2006-2008 Term.

Suresh Shenoy is on the adjunct faculty of the School of Information Technology & Engineering at George Mason University.  He has a Bachelor of Technology degree in Engineering from the Indian Institute of Technology, Bombay (1972), and a MBA from the University of Connecticut (1975).

Suresh Shenoy was a founding member of the Thomas Jefferson Partnership Fund and served on its board until 2002.  Thomas Jefferson Partnership Fund is a volunteer-driven nonprofit foundation for supporting the program and curriculum needs of Thomas Jefferson High School for Science & Technology, Alexandria, Virginia, United States.

Suresh Shenoy served on the board of the Fairfax County Library Foundation.  He has served as chairman of the Emerging Technologies Advisory Group (EMTAG) at the Association of Information and Image Management (AIIM) for 1996–1997, where he served on the International Board of Directors.  He was chairman of the International Society of Enterprise Engineers (ISEE), DC Chapter.  He has also served as co-chair of the BPR-SIG for the Industry Advisory Council to US Government CIOs- Chief Information Officers.  Suresh has spoken at numerous industry events, including the annual AIIM International shows, Imaging Expo in New York City, COMDEX, the Information Management Congress in Europe and CENADEM in Brazil and his articles have been published in various industry publications.  Suresh Shenoy was inducted as a Fellow of the Information Management Congress (Europe) and AIIM International (United States) in 2000.

References

Suresh Shenoy, Chairman of the Board, American Red Cross of the National Capital Region

External links
Suresh Shenoy in News Release of IMC- Information Management Consultants, Inc.
Bloomberg Businessweek Page on IMC
TOI News Article- Northern Virginia Community Foundation's Community Leader Award for 2009 for Shenoys and IMC
News Item- Suresh Shenoy Awarded for Community Leadership by Congressman Connolly, US House of Representatives, USA
Suresh Shenoy's Information on Fairfax County, Virginia, USA Web Site
About Thomas Jefferson Partnership Fund
Suresh Shenoy's Profile- IBM Information Champion Program
Suresh Shenoy on Board of Directors of Fairfax County Chamber of Commerce, USA
Suresh Shenoy's profile on IIT Alumni Web Site

Living people
American businesspeople
IIT Bombay alumni
Year of birth missing (living people)